Făgețelu is a commune in Olt County, Muntenia, Romania. It is composed of six villages: Bâgești, Chilia, Făgețelu, Gruiu, Isaci and Pielcani.

References

Communes in Olt County
Localities in Muntenia